The  is a traditional Japanese outfit worn only by courtiers, aristocrats and the emperor at the Japanese imperial court.

The exact composition of the  differs from person to person, and depends on a person's rank and whether they are a civil or military official, with military officers wearing the garment's outermost layers with split front and back panels, and civil officials having fully sewn panels. Colour also varies by rank, with colour symbolism having held great importance in Heian period Japan.

The  is typically reserved for the most formal occasions, such as weddings and enthronement ceremonies.

Colour symbolism

 First rank: purple
 Second rank: purple
 Third rank: purple
 Fourth rank: maroon
 Fifth rank: crimson
 Sixth rank: dark green
 Seventh rank: light green
 Eighth rank: dark blue
 Basic rank (ranks below eighth): light blue

Persons without rank typically wear mud brown or light yellow; the darker, fuller shade of yellow was reserved for the emperor. Though exact shades varied highly, with a number of colours detailed as having minuscule shade differences and thus different names, the highest-ranking shades were all achieved through dyeing fabric with the gromwell plant, an expensive and prolonged process that could take over a year to achieve. Due to the difficulty of obtaining a number of dyestuffs used to produce the purple and maroon colours worn by the highest-ranked officials, these colours were changed to black sometime during the Heian period.

Composition

The —a sleeveless vest often featuring embroidery—was worn over all these layers.

References

External links 

The Costume Museum | The Heian Period
Encyclopædia Britannica: 

Japanese full-body garments
Robes and cloaks
Court uniforms and dress
Japanese words and phrases